Raymond F. Hopkins (born February 15, 1939) is an American political science professor and expert on food politics and food policy. Hopkins taught at Swarthmore College from 1967 until his retirement in 2007, where he was the Richter Professor of Political Science.

Hopkins's research interests range from international organizations, economic development, and political economy to all aspects of food politics and food policy including food supply, security, and aid as well as hunger/famine and agricultural policy.

Biography
Hopkins graduated from Ohio Wesleyan University in 1960 with a Bachelor of Arts degree in philosophy. He attended Yale Divinity School and studied theology in 1961 but soon left to attend Ohio State University, where he received his Master of Arts in political science in 1963. He later returned to Yale University, where he received another Master of Arts and his Ph.D. in political science in 1968.

Hopkins taught at Swarthmore from 1967 until his retirement in 2007.  He was made a full professor in 1978 and was made the Richter Professor of Political Science in 1995. Hopkins was chair of the political science department at Swarthmore from 1983 to 1984 and from 1997 to 2000, and the director of the public policy program from 1989 to 1996.

Hopkins is married, has two grown children, and lives in Swarthmore, Pennsylvania.

Former positions and activities 

 Positions
 2000–2001: Acting Chair, Department of Political Science, Swarthmore College 
 1998–1999: Visiting scholar, Harvard University, Weatherhead Center for International Affairs
 1989–1996: Director, Public Policy Program, Swarthmore College 
 1987–1990: Chair, Department of Political Science, Swarthmore College 
 1984–1988: Director, Food Policy Program 
 1984–1985: Visiting Research Fellow, International Food Policy Research Institute, Washington, D.C. 
 1983–1984: Acting chair, Department of Political Science, Swarthmore College 
 1982–1983: Visiting scholar, Food Research Institute, Stanford University 
 1975: Research fellow, Center for International Affairs, Harvard University 
 1974–1975: Fellow, Woodrow Wilson International Center for Scholars, Washington, D.C. 
 1973–1974: Director, Center for Social and Policy Studies 
 1971: Research associate, University of Nairobi, Kenya 
 1970–1971: Visiting research associate, Indiana University 
 1969: Research associate, summer, Harvard University, Center for International Affairs 
 1968: Visiting scholar, summer, University of Michigan 
 1965–1966: Research associate, University College, Dar es Salaam, Tanzania 
 1964: Summer, Arms Control and Disarmament Agency—Special Study on Europe directed by Karl Deutsch 
 1963: Summer, Special study of Federal Reserve System, commissioned by Hon. Wright Patman, directed by *Harvey Mansfield 
 1962: Intern, summer, Ohio Democratic Headquarters, work on Governor DiSalle's re-election campaign 
 1960–1961: Assistant pastor, Newfield Methodist Church; Aide, Yale Psychiatric Institute

 Visiting professorships
 Visiting Professor, Department of Political Science, University of Pennsylvania, 1976, 1977, 1979. 
 Visiting Professor of Political Science, Columbia University, 1980. 
 Visiting Professor of Public and International Affairs, Princeton University, 1985. 
 Visiting Fulbright Distinguished Chair in International Economics, University of Tuscia, Viterbo, Italy, 1995.

 Congressional testimony
 House Committee on Foreign Affairs, Subcommittee on Africa, 1986. 
 House Committee on Science, Space and Technology, Subcommittee on Natural Resources, Agricultural Research and Environment, 1989. 
 House Select Committee on Hunger, "Restructuring Food Aid: Time for a Change?" Hearing held in Washington, D.C., June 22, 1989, Serial No. 101-9 (Washington: U.S. Government Printing Office, 1989). 
 House Committee on Foreign Affairs, Subcommittee on International Economic Policy and Trade, "Improving Food Aid: The Rationale for Reform in PL480," Washington, D.C., April 18, 1990.

 Research and professional service
 Board of Editors, Simulation & Games, 1977–1980
 Board of Editors, Comparative Strategy, 1979–1987
 Board of Editors, International Political Economy Yearbook, 1984–2000

 Consultancies
 U.S. State Department, 1977–78 
 U.S. Agency for International Development, 1979–83, 1988–94
 World Food Programme (Rome), 1985–86, 1990–91, 1994–96 
 Food and Agricultural Organization (Rome), 1983–87
 World Bank, 1988–1992
 CARE, 1979, 1993, 2000

 Fellowships/grants
 National Defense Education Fellow (1961–63) 
 Yale International Relations Grant 
 Danforth Teaching Intern (1963–67) 
 Foreign Area Fellow (1965–67) 
 Social Science Research Council (1969) 
 The American Philosophical Society (1971) 
 National Endowment for the Humanities (1973) 
 Guggenheim Fellow (1974) 
 Fellow, Woodrow Wilson International Center for Scholars (1975) 
 Rockefeller Fellow in International Conflict (1979) 
 Heinz Endowment (1982) 
 German Marshall Fund Fellow (1986) 
 Pew Faculty Fellowship, Harvard (1993) 
 Fulbright Fellowship (1995 – Italy: Distinguished Chair, International Economics) 
 Lang Faculty Fellowship (1998–99)

 Honors
 Phi Beta Kappa
 Pi Sigma Alpha 
 Distinction on Ph.D. dissertation 
 Executive Committee, American Political Science Association, 1992–1994 
 Executive Committee, IO Section, International Studies Association, 1993–1996

References

External links
Official website

Swarthmore College faculty
Ohio Wesleyan University alumni
Ohio State University Graduate School alumni
Harvard University staff
Academic staff of Tuscia University
Living people
Place of birth missing (living people)
1930s births
Yale Divinity School alumni